The following is a list of Public housing estates in Ma On Shan, Hong Kong, including Home Ownership Scheme (HOS), Private Sector Participation Scheme (PSPS), Sandwich Class Housing Scheme (SCHS), Flat-for-Sale Scheme (FFSS), and Tenants Purchase Scheme (TPS) estates.

Overview

Chevalier Garden 

Chevalier Garden is a HOS and PSPS court in Ma On Shan, next to MTR Tai Shui Hang station. It was jointly developed by the Hong Kong Housing Authority and Chevalier Group, and it was the first HOS court developed by Chevalier Group. It has totally 17 blocks built between 1987 and 1988.

Chung On Estate 

Chung On Estate is the fourth public housing estate in Ma On Shan. It is built on the reclaimed land approaching Sha Tin Hoi and Tolo Harbour. It consists of 5 residential blocks completed between 1996 and 2001, offering a total of 3,000 units.

Chung Wo House was placed under lockdown for mandatory covid-test on 21 February 2022. Chung Kwan House was sealed on 22 February.

Fok On Garden 

Fok On Garden is a HOS and PSPS court on the reclaimed land in Ma On Shan Town Centre, near MTR Ma On Shan station. It has 2 blocks built in 1992.

Fu Fai Garden 

Fu Fai Garden is a HOS and PSPS court on the reclaimed land in Ma On Shan Town Centre, near MTR Ma On Shan station. Jointly developed by the Hong Kong Housing Authority and CCECC (HK), the court has two blocks built in 1992.

Heng On Estate 

Heng On Estate is the first public housing estate in Ma On Shan. It consists of seven residential buildings completed in 1987. It is a mixed estate built on reclaimed land between Ma On Shan Road and Sai Sha Road. Some of the flats were sold to the tenants through Tenants Purchase Scheme Phase 1 in 1998. The Heng On Estate Commercial Centre and Central Garden received a Certificate of Merit at the 1989 Hong Kong Institute of Architects Annual Awards.

Heng Kong House was put under lockdown for mandatory covid testing between 5 & 6 February 2021. Heng Fung House was sealed on 22 February 2022.

Kam Chun Court 

Kam Chun Court is a HOS court under construction along Ma On Shan Road, Ma On Shan. Formerly the site of Tai Shui Hang Bicycle Park, the court comprises 5 blocks with totally 2,069 units. It is expected to complete in 2023.

Kam Fai Court 

Kam Fai Court is a HOS court in Hang Kin Street, Ma On Shan, near MTR Heng On station, Heng On Estate and Oceanaire. It comprises one 37-storey block with 735 units. It is expected to complete in 2020.

Kam Fung Court 

Kam Fung Court is a HOS court in Ma On Shan, built on the reclaimed land along Tide Cove shoreline. It has totally nine blocks built in 1996. However, three of the blocks, Kam Lei House, Kam Ho House and Kam Lan House, were unsold until the sales of surplus HOS flats Phase 3 and 4 in 2008. In the late 1990s, Kam Fung Court suffered from serious subsidence problem on its newly reclaimed land.

Kam Hay Court 

Kam Hay Court is a HOS court on the reclaimed land in Ma On Shan, near Yiu On Estate. It has three blocks built in 1989.

Kam Lung Court 

Kam Lung Court is a HOS court next to Lee On Estate. It has totally four blocks built in 1993.

Kam On Court 

Kam On Court is a HOS court on the reclaimed land in Ma On Shan, next to Heng On Estate and MTR Heng On station. It has three blocks built in 1987.

Kam Tai Court 

Kam Tai Court is a HOS court in Ma On Shan, built on the reclaimed land along Tide Cove shoreline, near MTR Tai Shui Hang station. It has totally 12 blocks completed in 2000.

Kam Ying Court 

Kam Ying Court is a HOS court. It has totally 10 blocks built at a hill called Ma On Terrace (or Saddle Ridge Terrace) and was completed in 1991.

Lee On Estate 

Lee On Estate is a public estate located at Wu Kai Sha and near MTR Wu Kai Sha station. It is the third public housing estate in Ma On Shan. It consists of five residential buildings completed in 1993 and 1994.

Park Belvedere 

Park Belvedere is a Sandwich Class Housing Scheme court on the reclaimed land of Ma On Shan Town Centre. Developed by the Hong Kong Housing Society, the court consists of four blocks built in 1998.

Saddle Ridge Garden 

Saddle Ridge Garden is a HOS and PSPS court in Ma On Shan, built at a hill called Ma On Terrace (or Saddle Ridge Terrace). It is named from the name of hill, Saddle Ridge. It was jointly developed by the Hong Kong Housing Authority and Chevalier Group, with totally 12 blocks built in 1993.

Yan On Estate 

Yan On Estate is a public rental estate south of Heng On Estate. The HK$800 million construction contract was awarded by the Housing Authority to Yau Lee Construction in 2009. The new estate opened in 2011 and comprises three blocks and a small commercial centre. It is designed to house about 6,800 residents in 2,587 flats. The estate is within walking distance of Heng On railway station on the Tuen Ma line.

The shopping centre opened with three shops: a cha chaan teng, a convenience store, and a mini-supermarket. In addition, an empty bay on the ground floor of Yan Hei House was converted into a fourth shop.

The estate is slated for expansion starting in 2018. The carpark will be converted into a multi-storey carpark cum shopping centre. Heng Tai Road will be diverted to make room for three more residential blocks with 1,600 flats to house about 4,900 residents. The expansion is scheduled for completion in 2021.

Yiu On Estate 

Yiu On Estate (耀安邨) is a public estate and TPS estate located in Ma On Shan in Sha Tin, New Territories, Hong Kong. It is the second housing estate in Ma On Shan. It was built on the reclaimed land between Ma On Shan Road and Sai Sha Road in 1988. Some of the flats were sold to the tenants through TPS Phase 2 in 1999.

The estate is home to the Ma On Shan campus of the Hong Kong College of Technology, a vocational institute.

See also
 Public housing in Hong Kong
 List of public housing estates in Hong Kong

References 

Ma On Shan